Laila Ahmed Eloui (born January 4, 1962 in Cairo), sometimes credited as Laila Eloui, Laila Olwy, Laila Elwi, and Laila Elwy, is an Egyptian actress. She has starred in more than 70 movies and has been honored at Egyptian and international festivals with awards for most of her roles. She has also been the head – or member – of several jury committees for local and international festivals. Recently, she has received an award for her lifetime achievements along with Egyptian actress Safia El Emari, South Korean actress Yoon Jeong-hee, American actor Richard Gere, and French actress Juliette Binoche during the opening of the 34th Cairo International Film Festival.

Early life 
Eloui was born in Cairo, Egypt, her father Ahmad Eloui is an Egyptian, while her mother Stella is Greek from Icaria. Eloui's maternal grandmother was of Italian descent, she came to Egypt to work at the Marriott Mena House Hotel.

Career 
Laila started her career at a young age. When she was a seven-year-old, she participated in radio and television programs, and at the age of fifteen she appeared onstage for the first time in Taman Sittat (8 Women), a play by Galal El Sharkawy.

Films 

 Min Agl Al-Haya (1977).
 Kharag wa Lam Ya'oud (1985).
 Ayam Al-Tahadi (1985).
 Gababerat Al-Mena (1985).
 Hekaya fi Kelmeteen (1985).
 Al-Nesaa (1985).
 Zawg  Eltalab (1985).
 Wa Tadhak Al-Akdar (1985).
 Al-Harafesh (1986).
 Al-Onsa (1986).
 Ah ya Balad (1986).
  Al-Tahdeed (1986).
 Azraa wa Thalath Regal (1986).
 Asr Al-Ze'ab (1986).
 Kelmeta.
 Ya Azizi Kolona Losous.
 Samaa Hoss.
 Ya Mehalabeya Ya.
 Al-Hagama.
 Ay Ay.
 Enzar Belta'a.
 Kalil Men Al Hob Katheer Men Al Onf.
 Al Ragol Al Talet.
 Esharet Morour.
 Tofah.
 Ya Donya Ya Gharami.
 Edhak Al Soura Tetla Helwa.
 Al-Massir (1997).
 Hala'a Housh (1997).
 Our Blessed Aunt (1998)
 Hob Al-Banat (2003).
 Baheb Al-Cima halif bro as Laila Eloui   (2005).
 Alwan elsama elsabaah (2008).
 Laylat Al Baby Doll (2008).
 Hakayat Bin Ash-ha (2009).
 El Basabees We El 3osyan describing the story of a girl who became psychotic after her brother took her toka
 Brooks, Meadows and Lovely Faces (2016)

Television 
 "Lahazat Harega" "Critical moments" (2007)
 Shams (2014)
 Napoleon Wal Mahrousa (2012)
 Wa Kan Wahman (TV short) 1984

References

External links
 
 Laila Elwi awarded in Canada
 Laila Elwi, a mother of five next Ramadan season
 Laila Elwi won't be meeting with ‘Muhannad’
 Laila Elwi refuses marriage to Saddam Hussein

1962 births
Living people
Egyptian film actresses
Egyptian people of Greek descent
Egyptian people of Italian descent
Actresses from Cairo
Egyptian television actresses